Tuberculatus is a genus of insects belonging to the family Aphididae.

The genus was described in 1894 by Aleksandr Mordvilko.

The genus has cosmopolitan distribution.

Species:
 Tuberculatus annulatus (Hartig, 1841)

References

Aphididae
Sternorrhyncha genera